Robert Michael Grotte (11 December 1913 – 15 December 1964) was a New Zealand professional rugby league footballer who played in the 1930s.

Auckland born, Grotte came to St. George in 1935 and had a successful season, playing 12 first grade games. He moved to the Moree district to play one season in 1936, and then returned to St. George again for the 1937 season playing one first grade match. In 1938 he moved to Auckland and played for Marist Old Boys. He was also named in the touring Kiwi team that toured Australia in 1938 and he played one games for his national team. While at Marist he played 3 seasons with his brother William who was a forward.

Robert Grotte died on 15 December 1964, in Auckland and is buried at Waikumete Cemetery.

References

St. George Dragons players
Marist Saints players
City Rovers players
New Zealand rugby league players
1913 births
1964 deaths
New Zealand national rugby league team players
Auckland rugby league team players
Rugby league five-eighths